Miroslav Radačovský (born 24 September 1953 in Ľutina) is a Slovak politician, former judge, who was elected as a Member of the European Parliament in 2019.

Miroslav Radačovský served in the judiciary for 37 years and 214 days. Up until his joining the European Parliament, he worked at the District Court in Poprad. 
As a judge, he led a land ownership case against former Slovak President Andrej Kiska, which Andrej Kiska lost. Miroslav Radačovský resigned as a judge due to retirement age. He decided to run for the European Parliament and he was successful. Currently he is a Member of the European Parliament, non-attached to any group.

Slovak PATRIOT
In 2020, a group of active young citizens in Slovakia called upon Miroslav Radačovský to become the leader of a new political party. The political party Slovak PATRIOT was established following a signature collection campaign in Slovakia in 2020. In expression of the will of thousands of Slovak citizens, the political party  Slovak PATRIOT was born on February 10, 2021. During the 1st assembly of the party on February 20, 2021, Miroslav Radačovský was elected Chairman.

References

Living people
MEPs for Slovakia 2019–2024
People's Party Our Slovakia politicians
1953 births
People from Sabinov District